Good Bad Girl is an Indian Hindi language comedy-drama web-series based on the journey of Maya Ahuja, a lawyer who finds creative ways of getting out of trouble. The show stars Samridhi Dewan as the protagonist along with Vaibhav Raj Gupta, Gul Panag, Sheeba Chaddha and Rajendra Sethi and is directed by Abhishek Sen Gupta and produced by Vikas Bahl and Anuraag Srivastava.

The show is now streaming exclusively on Sony LIV.

Cast

 Samridhi Dewan as Maya/Mayo
 Vaibhav Raj Gupta as Sahil Mistry
 Gul Panag as Zaina Mistry
 Zain Khan Durrani as Prithvi Banerjee
 Sohum Majumdar as Dr. Punit
 Aradhya Aanjna as Young Maya a.k.a. Bulbul
 Rajendra Sethi as Raman Ahuja
 Sheeba Chaddha as Nimmi Ahuja
 Namrata Sheth as Jhilmil Lohia
Aarush Thakur as Ashwin
Shayank Shukla as Jamsmeet Kaul-MLA

Synopsis

It's the story of a middle-class girl, Maya Ahuja, who as a young child, experiences societal pressure to speak properly and draw the line between truth and lies. As she gets older, she learns that lying is the only way to accomplish her goals. An adult Maya is put in a difficult situation when she learns that she might lose her job. In such a scenario, deception would be her safe haven.

Episodic Synopsis

References

External links
 

Comedy-drama web series
Hindi-language web series
Indian drama web series
2022 Indian television series endings